Eugene "Pooh" Jeter III (born December 2, 1983) is an American-born naturalized Ukrainian professional basketball player for the NBA G League Ignite of the NBA G League.

Professional career 
Jeter went undrafted at the 2006 NBA draft. He played his first professional season with the Colorado 14ers of the NBA D-League.

In August 2007, Jeter moved to Europe and signed a one-year deal with BC Kyiv of Ukraine.

In August 2008, Jeter moved to Spain and signed a one-year deal with ViveMenorca of the Liga ACB.

In September 2009, Jeter signed with Unicaja Málaga. In November 2009, he left Unicaja and signed with Hapoel Jerusalem of Israel for the remainder of the season.

On July 21, 2010, Jeter signed with the Sacramento Kings.

In August 2011, Jeter returned to Spain and signed with Joventut Badalona for the 2011–12 season.

In September 2012, Jeter signed with Shandong Lions of the Chinese Basketball Association. In July 2014, he extended his contract with Shandong for two more years.

On March 21, 2015, Jeter signed with Limoges CSP of France for the rest of the 2014–15 LNB Pro A season.

On July 14, 2015, Jeter re-signed with the Shandong Lions for the 2015–16 season.

In October 2016, Jeter signed with Tianjin Gold Lions for the 2016–17 CBA season. On April 11, 2017, he signed with Turkish club Beşiktaş for the rest of the 2016–17 Basketbol Süper Ligi season. However he did not play for them because Beşiktaş was banned by FIBA from registering new players and the deal could not be completed.

On January 1, 2021, Jeter signed with BC Dnipro of the Ukrainian Basketball SuperLeague.

On October 28, 2021, Jeter signed with the NBA G League Ignite.

International career 
In 2013, Jeter helped the senior Ukrainian national basketball team qualify for the FIBA World Cup for the first time since the Soviet Union broke apart, by being the team's leader in assists during the 2013 EuroBasket tournament, with an average of 4.1 assists per game.

Personal life 
Jeter is the younger brother of sprinter Carmelita Jeter, a two-time IAAF World Athletics Final gold medalist.

Career statistics

NBA

Regular season 

|-
| style="text-align:left;"| 
| style="text-align:left;"| Sacramento
| 62 || 1 || 13.8 || .409 || .200 || .902 || 1.1 || 2.6 || .5 || .0 || 4.1
|- class="sortbottom"
| colspan=2 style="text-align:center;"| Career
| 62 || 1 || 13.8 || .409 || .200 || .902 || 1.1 || 2.6 || .5 || .0 || 4.1

EuroLeague 

|-
| style="text-align:left;"| 2009–10
| style="text-align:left;"| Unicaja
| 3 || 1 || 14.9 || .333 || .111 || .500 || .3 || 1.7 || .3 || .0 || 5.3 || 1.7
|- class="sortbottom"
| colspan=2 style="text-align:center;"| Career
| 3 || 1 || 14.9 || .333 || .111 || .500 || .3 || 1.7 || .3 || .0 || 5.3 || 1.7

References

External links 

 Liga ACB profile
 CBA stats
 eurobasket.com profile
 EuroLeague profile

1983 births
Living people
20th-century African-American people
21st-century African-American sportspeople
2014 FIBA Basketball World Cup players
African-American basketball players
American emigrants to Ukraine
American expatriate basketball people in China
American expatriate basketball people in France
American expatriate basketball people in Israel
American expatriate basketball people in Spain
American expatriate basketball people in Ukraine
American men's basketball players
Baloncesto Málaga players
Basketball players from Los Angeles
BC Kyiv players
Colorado 14ers players
Fujian Sturgeons players
Hapoel Jerusalem B.C. players
Israeli Basketball Premier League players
Joventut Badalona players
Junípero Serra High School (Gardena, California) alumni
Liga ACB players
Limoges CSP players
Menorca Bàsquet players
Naturalized citizens of Ukraine
NBA G League Ignite players
Point guards
Portland Pilots men's basketball players
Sacramento Kings players
Shandong Hi-Speed Kirin players
Tianjin Pioneers players
Ukrainian expatriate basketball people in France
Ukrainian expatriate basketball people in Spain
Ukrainian expatriate sportspeople in China
Ukrainian men's basketball players
Undrafted National Basketball Association players